The 1901 Albion football team, sometimes known as the Albion Methodists, was an American football team that represented Albion College in the Michigan Intercollegiate Athletic Association (MIAA) during the 1901 college football season. The team compiled a 7–4–1 record. One year earlier, the 1900 Albion team was the MIAA champion with a 6–1–2 record and six shutouts to its credit.

Albion played five of its games in 1901 against opponents that later became NCAA Division I FBS football programs, compiling a 2–2–1 record in those games.  Albion opened its season with a loss to national champion Michigan, a team that outscored its 1901 opponents by a total of 550 to 0. Albion also played two games against Michigan Agricultural (later renamed Michigan State University), resulting in a loss and a tie. The team also swept a two-game series with Michigan State Normal (later renamed Eastern Michigan University), defeating the Normal School by scores of 29–0 and 39–6.

Albion was led in 1901 by third-year head coach Chester Brewer who went on to be the head coach at Michigan State for 10 years and the athletic director at the University of Missouri for 13 years.

Tackle P. B. Exelby was the team captain. Joe Maddock played principally at right halfback and was the star of the 1901 Albion team.  He was so effective against Michigan that coach Fielding H. Yost enticed him to transfer there. He became a star for Yost's "Point-a-Minute" teams in 1902 and 1903.

Schedule

References

Albion
Albion Britons football seasons
Albion football